Sixology  is the sixth studio album by Singaporean singer JJ Lin, released on 18 October 2008 by Ocean Butterflies.

The album won for an IFPI Hong Kong Top Sales Music Award for Top 10 Best Selling Mandarin Album of the Year.

The album features a duet and music video, "Little Dimples" features Charlene Choi which also released in her debut studio album Lonely Me.

Track listing
 "Sixology"
 "不潮不用花錢" (High Fashion) feat. By2
 "小酒窩" (Little Dimples) feat. Charlene Choi
 "黑武士" (Lord Vader)
 "醉赤壁" (Tale of the Red Cliff)
 "由你選擇" (The Choice Is Yours) feat. FAMA
 "Always Online"
 "街道" (The Streets)
 "主角" (Centerstage) feat. Machi
 "我還想她" (I Still Miss Her)
 "點一把火炬" (Light the Torch)
 "期待愛" (Longing for Love) feat. Kym
 "Cries in a Distance"
 "愛與希望" (Love, Hope)

References

2008 albums
JJ Lin albums